Lee Stocking Airport  is a public use airport located near Lee Stocking, the Bahamas.

See also
List of airports in the Bahamas

References

External links 
 Airport record for Lee Stocking Airport at Landings.com

Airports in the Bahamas